Cyphonism (from , "bent, crooked") was a form of punishment using a , a kind of wooden pillory in which the neck of a malefactor would be fastened. Formerly, this term was widely believed to refer to scaphism, a form of punishment or torture in which a person's naked body was smeared with honey, and exposed to flies, wasps, and other pests.

References

Physical restraint
Punishments
Torture

el:Κύφωνας